With U is the second Japanese mini-album by Big Bang, released on May 28, 2008.

Background 
After experiencing breakthrough success in their home country with the song "Lies" and "Last Farewell", BigBang expanded their endeavors to Japan, hoping to produce similar results. In 2009, American music publishing company Sony/ATV Music Publishing accused YG Entertainment of plagiarism, and listed four songs recorded by several of YG's artists as having been plagiarized. BigBang's single "With U" was included as part of the accusation and deemed to have copied from R&B singer Joe's 2004 single "Ride wit U", with Sony stating they would take legal action. YG Entertainment denied all accusations.

Track listing

References

External links
Big Bang Official site
Big Bang Japan Official Site

BigBang (South Korean band) EPs
2008 EPs
YG Entertainment EPs
Albums produced by G-Dragon